Ferran Olivella Pons (born 22 June 1936) is a Spanish former footballer who played as a defender.

Club career
Born in Barcelona, Catalonia, Olivella joined FC Barcelona's youth ranks at the age of 17. He started playing as a senior with neighbouring SD España Industrial in the Segunda División, returning to the Camp Nou in 1956.

Olivella appeared in 509 competitive games during his spell with his main club, scoring 12 times. He won back-to-back La Liga championships from 1958 to 1960, his only goal as a professional occurring on 14 February 1960 in an 8–0 home demolition of UD Las Palmas.

International career
Olivella earned 18 caps for the Spain national team in eight years. He made his debut on 31 March 1957, in a 5–0 friendly win against Belgium.

Olivella acted as captain when the country won the 1964 European Nations' Cup. He was also selected for the 1966 FIFA World Cup held in England, being an unused squad member in an eventual group-stage exit.

Honours
Barcelona
La Liga: 1958–59, 1959–60
Copa del Generalísimo: 1957, 1958–59, 1962–63, 1967–68
Inter-Cities Fairs Cup: 1955–58, 1958–60, 1965–66

Spain
UEFA European Championship: 1964

Spain U18
UEFA European Under-18 Championship: 1954

Individual
UEFA European Championship Team of the Tournament: 1964

References

External links

FC Barcelona profile

1936 births
Living people
Spanish footballers
Footballers from Barcelona
Association football defenders
La Liga players
Segunda División players
CD Condal players
FC Barcelona players
Spain youth international footballers
Spain amateur international footballers
Spain B international footballers
Spain international footballers
1964 European Nations' Cup players
1966 FIFA World Cup players
UEFA European Championship-winning players
UEFA European Championship-winning captains
Catalonia international footballers